A recommended exposure limit (REL) is an occupational exposure limit that has been recommended by the United States National Institute for Occupational Safety and Health. The REL is a level that NIOSH believes would be protective of worker safety and health over a working lifetime if used in combination with engineering and work practice controls, exposure and medical monitoring, posting and labeling of hazards, worker training and personal protective equipment. To formulate these recommendations, NIOSH evaluates all known and available medical, biological, engineering, chemical, trade, and other information. Although not legally enforceable limits, RELS are transmitted to the Occupational Safety and Health Administration (OSHA) or the Mine Safety and Health Administration (MSHA) of the U.S. Department of Labor for use in promulgating legal standards.

All RELs are located in the NIOSH Pocket Guide to Chemical Hazards, along with other key data for 677 chemical or substance groupings. The Pocket Guide is a source of general industrial hygiene information for workers, employers, and occupational health professionals.

NIOSH recommendations are also published in a variety of documents, including:

 Criteria documents - These recommend workplace exposure limits and appropriate preventive measures to reduce or eliminate adverse health effects and accidental injuries.
 Current Intelligence Bulletins (CIBs) - These share new scientific information about occupational hazards, highlighting a formerly unrecognized hazard, reporting new data on a known hazard, or presenting information on hazard control.
 Alerts, Special Hazard Reviews, Occupational Hazard Assessments, and Technical Guidelines - These assess the safety and health problems associated with a given agent or hazard and recommend appropriate control and surveillance methods. Although these documents are not intended to supplant the more comprehensive criteria documents, they are prepared to assist OSHA and MSHA in the formulation of regulation.

In addition to these publications, NIOSH periodically presents testimony before various Congressional committees and at OSHA and MSHA rulemaking hearings.

References

External links
NIOSH Pocket Guide to Chemical Hazards

National Institute for Occupational Safety and Health
Environmental standards
Chemical safety